Lock End LOL (stylized as LOCK END LOL) is the second single album by South Korean girl group Weki Meki. It was released by Fantagio Music and distributed by Interpark on May 14, 2019. It consists of three songs, including the lead single, "Picky Picky".

The single album was later re-released as Week End LOL on August 8, 2019, with "Tiki-Taka (99%)" as lead single.

Release 
Lock End LOL was released as a digital download on May 14, 2019, through several music portals, including MelOn and iTunes. It was also released as a CD single on May 17.

Chart performance

Lock End LOL
The single album debuted at number 6 on the Gaon Album Chart for the week ending May 18. In its second week, the single fell to number 40. In its third week, the single rose to number 18 and fell to number 27 in its fourth week.

The album placed at number 24 for the month of May with 12,373 physical copies sold. It also placed at number 56 for the month of June with 3,254 additional copies sold. It has sold 20,051 copies as of July 2019.

Week End LOL
The reissue debuted at number 7 on the Gaon Album Chart for the week ending August 17. In its second week, the reissue fell to number to number 25, and in a third week to number 32. The album placed at number 26 for the month of August with 9,149 physical copies sold.

Track listing

Charts

Release history

References 

2019 singles
Weki Meki albums
Single albums